A list of notable Polish politicians of the Social Democracy of Poland.

A
 Bartosz Arłukowicz

B
 Marek Borowski

C
 Andrzej Celiński

G
 Genowefa Grabowska

K
 Jerzy Kulej

N
 Tomasz Nałęcz

P
 Józef Pinior

R
 Dariusz Rosati

S
 Izabella Sierakowska

Z
 Zbigniew Zychowicz

 
Social Democracy